AGBU Vatche & Tamar Manoukian High School was a private Armenian-American school located in Pasadena, California, United States, which opened its doors in September 2006 and closed in 2020. The campus is owned and operated by the Armenian General Benevolent Union, the largest Armenian philanthropic organization in the diaspora that also sponsors 17 Armenian day schools around the world. The school was administratively and academically affiliated with AGBU Manoogian-Demirdjian School, a college preparatory high school in the San Fernando Valley region of Los Angeles. The school met high school requirements, which included a science lab, library, indoor gym, computer lab, assembly hall, and cafeteria.

During the semester of 2013, the school added more electives including International Issues, Globalization and Public Policy, secured each classroom with a smartboard, established diverse clubs that students can participate in during the day.

It was one of the 570 member schools of the California Interscholastic Federation, or CIF Southern Section which competes in varsity sports. Its athletic department included a boys' varsity team, a boys' junior varsity team, and a girls' varsity team.

In October 2019, the Armenian General Benevolent Union announced the impending closure of the school, citing declining enrollment numbers. The announcement was met with widespread condemnation from Armenian students across Southern California. For days after the announcement students of the school were joined by those from other Armenian Schools including Rose and Alex Pilibos Armenian School, St. Gregory A. & M. Hovsepian School, Sahag Mesrob Armenian Christian School in protests both at the campus and at the Western Diocese of the Armenian Church.

The school hosted an event for students to get to know about other Armenian high school options in Southern California on November 5. The students organized a boycott of this event as a testament to their determination to keep their school open.

The school transitioned to online learning due to the COVID-19 pandemic in March 2020, and closed in June 2020; the closure was announced in 2019. AGBU cited the increasing costs as the reason for the closure.

See also
 History of the Armenian Americans in Los Angeles

References

External links 
 
 AGBU Vatche and Tamar Manoukian High School website

Schools in Pasadena, California
Armenian-American culture in California
Armenian-American private schools
Armenian General Benevolent Union
Private high schools in Los Angeles County, California
Educational institutions established in 2006
2006 establishments in California
Educational institutions disestablished in 2020
2020 disestablishments in California